Riccardo Pinzi (born 17 August 2003) is an Italian footballer who plays as a midfielder for  club Fermana.

Club career
On 20 August 2022, Pinzi signed with Fermana.

Personal life
Pinzi is the son of former Udinese player, and Italy international, Giampiero Pinzi.

Club statistics

Club

Notes

References

2003 births
Living people
Italian footballers
Association football midfielders
Udinese Calcio players
Fermana F.C. players
Serie A players
Serie C players